

Portugal
 Angola – José de Oliveira Barbosa, Governor of Angola (1810–1816)
 Macau – Bernardo Aleixo de Lemos e Faria, Governor of Macau (1810–1814)

Spanish Empire
Viceroyalty of New Spain – 
Francisco Javier Venegas, marqués de la Reunión y de Nueva España, Viceroy of New Spain (1810–1813)
Félix María Calleja del Rey, conde de Calderón, Viceroy of New Spain (1813–1816)
Captaincy General of Cuba – Juan Ruíz de Apodaca, Governor of Cuba (1812–1816)
Spanish East Indies – 
Manuel Gonzalez de Aguilar, Governor-General of the Philippines (1810–1813)
José de Gardoqui Jaraveita, Governor-General of the Philippines (1813–1816)
Captaincy General of Santo Domingo – Carlos de Urrutia y Montoya, Governor of Santo Domingo (1813–1819)
Commandancy General of the Provincias Internas – Nemesio Salcedo y Salcedo (1802–1813)
Viceroyalty of Peru – José Fernando Abascal y Sousa, marqués de la Concordia, Viceroy of Peru (1806–1816)
Captaincy General of Chile – 
José Antonio de Pareja y Mariscal, Governor and Captain-General of Chile (1812–1813) 
Juan Francisco Sánchez, Governor and Captain-General of Chile (1813–1814)

United Kingdom
 Cayman Islands – William Bodden, Chief Magistrate of the Cayman Islands (1776–1823)
 Malta
 Hildebrand Oakes, Civil Commissioner of Malta (1810–1813)
 Thomas Maitland, Governor of Malta (1813–1824)
 New South Wales – Lachlan Macquarie, Governor of New South Wales (1810–1821)

Colonial governors
Colonial governors
1813